Alois Muna, also Alois Můňa (23 February 1886, Lysice – 2 August 1943, Kladno), was a Czechoslovak politician and one of the founders and interwar period general secretary of the Communist Party of Czechoslovakia.

References

Czech communists
Communist Party of Czechoslovakia politicians
1886 births
1943 deaths
People from Blansko District